Mount Vernon and Fairway (subtitled A Fairy Tale) is an EP by the American rock band the Beach Boys that was included as a bonus record with their 1973 release Holland. It is a 12-minute musical fairy tale, primarily composed by Brian Wilson, assembled by Carl Wilson, and narrated by manager Jack Rieley. Brian provided the voice of the Pied Piper and drew the sleeve cover.

Storyline
Mount Vernon and Fairway tells the story of a Pied Piper who lives inside a glowing transistor radio owned by a family of royalty. He introduces magical music to the young princes and princesses, but disappears forever once they stop believing in his existence.

Background

In the summer of 1972, Wilson joined his bandmates when they temporarily moved base to Holland and recorded the basic tracks for the album of the same name. While living in a Dutch house called "the Flowers" and listening repeatedly to Randy Newman's newest album Sail Away, Wilson was inspired to write a fairy tale that was loosely based on his memories listening to the radio at Mike Love's family home as a teenager. Wilson said that he listened to Sail Away "over and over" while physically writing down the lyrics that became the fairy tale.

His 2016 memoir, I Am Brian Wilson, shares further details:

Asked about Mount Vernon and Fairway in a 2013 interview, manager Jack Rieley commented,

Wilson later recycled the melody of "Better Get Back In Bed" for his unreleased song "Lazy Lizzie". Likewise, one of the early versions of "Ding Dang" has a riff similar to "I'm the Pied Piper". "Better Get Back in Bed" stemmed from the unreleased Holland outtake "Pa, Let Her Go Out".

Recording and release

According to Wilson, due to the fairy tale's relatively long length, the group rejected it for inclusion on Holland. He recalled that when he proposed the concept to the group, "Nobody was ready for that. Nobody. I remember, Carl said, 'WHAT?'" Rieley remembered, "I was very weirded out by that little suite! I was not enthusiastic about it. That was one situation in which Brian Wilson insisted that the song be a part of the album." 

Wilson said that he subsequently "got fucked up" and "depressed", leaving Carl to do "all the editing on it and even did part of it himself when I wasn't there." Ultimately, as a compromise, Carl proposed that Mount Vernon and Fairway instead be released as a bonus EP packaged with Holland.

Mike Love's account differed. "Brian thought up the idea of the fairy tale in Holland, and we all thought it was great how the whole thing came together. We all loved working on it, and from the start we thought it made a great little 'present' to go with the album, so that's what we did."

While most 7” singles and EPs are released in 45 RPM, this EP was released in 33 RPM. An instrumental version of Mount Vernon and Fairway without narration appears on the 1993 box set Good Vibrations: Thirty Years of The Beach Boys.

Proposed follow-up
Journalist Brian Chidester reported the existence of a cassette tape, given by Wilson to photographer Ed Roach, that reveals Wilson's plans for a second fairy tale. "According to Roach, the recording features Wilson reciting a narrative about two young girls who get lost in the woods on their way to school. Wilson’s daughters, Carnie and Wendy, play the roles of the young girls over a cute musical track."

"Mount Vernon Farewell"
In 2021, Wilson included a piano reworking of the fairy tale, titled "Mount Vernon Farewell", on his album At My Piano.

Track listing
All narration by Jack Rieley, except "Magic Transistor Radio", which was narrated by Rieley, Brian Wilson, and Carl Wilson.

References

Bibliography

External links
 
 

1973 EPs
The Beach Boys EPs
American fairy tales